The Mabel Public Library is a public library in Mabel, Minnesota. It is a member of Southeastern Libraries Cooperating, the SE Minnesota library region.

References

External links
Online Catalog

Public libraries in Minnesota
Education in Fillmore County, Minnesota
Buildings and structures in Fillmore County, Minnesota